Roger Quinche (22 July 1922 – 3 September 1982) was a Swiss football midfielder who played for Switzerland in the 1950 FIFA World Cup. He also played for Grasshopper Club Zürich and BSC Young Boys.

References

1922 births
1982 deaths
Swiss men's footballers
Switzerland international footballers
Association football midfielders
Grasshopper Club Zürich players
FC Bern players
1950 FIFA World Cup players
Sportspeople from Basel-Landschaft